Wawakapewin First Nation (Oji-Cree: ᐙᐙᑲᐯᐎᐣ ᓂᐢᑕᒼ ᐊᓂᐦᔑᓂᓂᐗᐠ (Waawaagabewin Nistam Anishininiwag); unpointed: ᐗᐗᑲᐯᐎᐣ ᓂᐢᑕᒼ ᐊᓂᔑᓂᓂᐗᐠ) is an Oji-Cree First Nation reserve located 350 kilometers north of Sioux Lookout, Ontario. It is only accessible by air and the winter road system from Pickle Lake.  It is a small community in which the registered population in June 2013 was 73, of which 43 lived on their own Reserve.  The current Chief is Anne-Marie Beardy.  Wawakapewin First Nation is a member of Shibogama First Nations Council.

Official address
Wawakapewin First Nationc/o Shibogama First Nation CouncilPO Box 449Sioux Lookout, Ontario P8T 1A5

External links
First Nation Connectivity Profile for Wawakapewin First Nation.
AANDC profile

References

Oji-Cree reserves in Ontario
Communities in Kenora District
Nishnawbe Aski Nation